Odes may refer to:

The plural of ode, a type of poem 
Odes (Horace), a collection of poems by the Roman author Horace, circa 23 BCE
Odes of Solomon, a pseudepigraphic book of the Bible
Book of Odes (Bible), a Deuterocanonical book of the Bible
Odes (Irene Papas album)
Odes (The Flowers of Hell album)
Odes, Victor Hugo's second poetry book
Classic of Poetry, a book from ancient China that has been translated as Odes
ODEs may be an abbreviation for ordinary differential equations
Odic force
"-odes", a suffix used in taxonomy

See also

 
 OD (disambiguation)
 ODS (disambiguation)
 ODE (disambiguation)
 Ode (disambiguation)